Joe D. Humerickhouse (born April 14, 1940) is an American politician who served in the Kansas House of Representatives as a Republican from the 59th district from 1995 to 2008.

References

Living people
1940 births
Republican Party members of the Kansas House of Representatives
20th-century American politicians
21st-century American politicians
People from Osage City, Kansas
Politicians from Topeka, Kansas